Diane Jergens (born Dianne Irgens; March 31, 1935 –  October 9, 2018) was an American film and television actress.

Early years 
Jergens was the daughter of Norman C. Irgens, an alderman in Minneapolis, and his wife. In 1944, at age 8, she auditioned for two film studios in Hollywood and was asked to return to make a film. In 1950, the family moved to Hollywood. When Jergens was 16, she was a member of the Heidt Steppers dancing troupe, which was part of the Horace Heidt Show. Soon after Jergens graduated from Hollywood High School, she performed as a singer on tour with composer Jimmy McHugh.

Career 
She made her screen debut in the 1946 film Ginger. She was featured in such 1950s films as The FBI Story with James Stewart and Desk Set starring Spencer Tracy and Katharine Hepburn. Her other films included leading roles in High School Confidential and Island of Lost Women. On television, she portrayed Francine Williams on The Bob Cummings Show in the 1955–1956 season, and she had a recurring role on The George Burns and Gracie Allen Show. She also appeared on other TV shows such as Dragnet, The Danny Thomas Show, The Addams Family, and 77 Sunset Strip.

Personal life 
Jergens was married to actor Peter Brown between 1958 and 1960. In 1962, she wed musician and songwriter Randy Sparks. They had four children, Kevin Ray Sparks, Melinda Anne Sparks & Cameron Michael Sparks (twins), and Amanda Hamilton Sparks.   She died on October 9, 2018.

Filmography

References

External links 
 
 Diane Jergens at the American Film Institute

1935 births
2018 deaths
American film actresses
American television actresses
Actresses from Minneapolis
21st-century American women